The Embassy of Sri Lanka in Washington, D.C. is the  Democratic Socialist Republic of Sri Lanka's diplomatic mission to the United States. It is located at 3025 Whitehaven Street N.W. in Washington, D.C.'s Kalorama neighborhood. 

As of May 2021, the current Ambassador is Ravinatha Pandukabhaya Aryasinha.

References

External links
 Official website

Sri Lanka
Washington, D.C.
Sri Lanka–United States relations